{{DISPLAYTITLE:C8H14N2O2}}
The molecular formula C8H14N2O2 may refer to:

 Etiracetam, a chemical compound belonging to the racetam family
 Levetiracetam, a medication used to treat epilepsy